Richard Thomas Hunter (born September 25, 1974) is a former Major League Baseball pitcher who played in  with the Philadelphia Phillies. In 1995, Hunter went a combined 19–2 with a 2.73 ERA between the Piedmont Boll Weevils, Clearwater Phillies, and Reading Phillies. As a result, he was a winner of the Paul Owens Award, given annually to the top pitcher and position player in the Phillies' farm system (David Doster and Wendell Magee were co-winners among position players).

External links

1974 births
Living people
Baseball players from California
Major League Baseball pitchers
Philadelphia Phillies players
Allentown Ambassadors players
Chattanooga Lookouts players
Clearwater Phillies players
Martinsville Phillies players
Piedmont Phillies players
Reading Phillies players
Scranton/Wilkes-Barre Red Barons players